Sweetheart of the Doomed is a 1917 American silent war drama film directed by Reginald Barker and starring Louise Glaum, Charles Gunn, and Tom Guise. The film's sets were designed by the art director Robert Brunton.

Cast
 Louise Glaum as Honore Zonlay
 Charles Gunn as Paul Montaigne
 Tom Guise as Gen. Gabriel Durand
 Roy Laidlaw as Gen. Jacques du Fresne

References

Bibliography
 Codori, Jeff. Film History Through Trade Journal Art, 1916-1920. McFarland, 2020.

External links
 

1917 films
1917 drama films
1910s English-language films
American silent feature films
Silent American drama films
American black-and-white films
Triangle Film Corporation films
Films directed by Reginald Barker
1910s American films